Free Fall is a 2014 American direct-to-video crime thriller film directed by Malek Akkad in his feature debut and starring Sarah Butler, Malcolm McDowell and D. B. Sweeney. It follows an employee followed by an assassin and locked in an elevator.

Plot

When the sudden and shocking death of a coworker sends everyone reeling at Gault Capital, Jane Porter (Sarah Butler), uncovers a very dangerous secret. Her boss, charismatic billionaire Thaddeus Gault (Malcolm McDowell), is suspected of massive financial fraud. An assassin, Frank (D.B. Sweeney), is dispatched to silence her forever. Jane's flight from the office is forestalled when her pursuer shuts down her elevator. Now, trapped and alone, Jane must find a way to escape her steel cage before the killer reaches her. This brooding and relentless thriller plunges our heroine, Jane, into a free fall of betrayal and terror. To survive Jane must find the inner strength and courage to defeat the powers that hold her and her dreams captive by fear.

Cast
 D.B. Sweeney as Frank
 Sarah Butler as Jane Porter
 Malcolm McDowell as Thaddeus Gault
 Ian Gomez as Ronald Taft
 Adam Tomei as Robert
 Mustafa Speaks as Lamont
 Thea Rubley as Colleen
 Jayson Blair as Ray
 Kristina Klebe as Pam
 Bill Leaman as Mike
 Annie Tedesco as Helen
 Justin Beahm as Background

External links
 
 
 
 

2014 films
2014 crime thriller films
American crime thriller films
2014 directorial debut films
2010s English-language films
2010s American films